Darren Fisher  (born September 10, 1965) is a Canadian Liberal politician who has represented the riding of Dartmouth—Cole Harbour in the House of Commons of Canada since 2015.

Prior to his election to the House of Commons, Fisher served on Halifax Regional Council from 2009 to 2015.

Electoral record

References

External links
 Official Website

Living people
Members of the House of Commons of Canada from Nova Scotia
Liberal Party of Canada MPs
Halifax Regional Municipality councillors
1965 births
21st-century Canadian politicians